Harry Wittig (born 19 June 1961) is a German archer. He competed in the men's individual event at the 1984 Summer Olympics.

References

External links
 

1961 births
Living people
German male archers
Olympic archers of West Germany
Archers at the 1984 Summer Olympics
People from Böblingen
Sportspeople from Stuttgart (region)